The Hotel Negresco is a hotel and site of the restaurant Le Chantecler, located on the Promenade des Anglais on the Baie des Anges in Nice, France. It was named after Henri Negresco (1868–1920), who had the palatial hotel constructed in 1912. In keeping with the conventions of the times, when the Negresco opened in 1913 its front opened on the side opposite the Mediterranean Sea.

History 
Henri Negresco, born Alexandru Negrescu, was the son of an innkeeper. He was educated and worked as a confectioner at the luxurious Casa Capșa in Bucharest, Romania, left home at the age of 25 (earlier sources mentioned 15, but it is not really possible, he finished the military service in Romania and there is at least one photo with him in Bucharest at older age) going first to Paris then to the French Riviera where he became very successful. As director of the Municipal Casino in Nice, he had the idea to build a sumptuous hotel of quality that would attract the wealthiest of clients. After arranging the financing, he hired the great architect of the "café society" Édouard-Jean Niermans to design the hotel and its now famous pink dome.  The spectacular Baccarat 16,309-crystal chandelier in the Negresco's Royal Lounge was commissioned by Czar Nicholas II, who due to the October revolution was unable to take delivery.

Contrary to popular belief, the large window of the Royal Lounge – listed as an Historical Monument – is not the work of Gustave Eiffel. Eiffel never worked at the Negresco; instead it is entirely the work of Edouard-Jean Niermans.

Henri Negresco faced a downturn in his affairs when World War I broke out two years after he opened for business. His hotel was converted to a hospital. By the end of the war, the number of wealthy visitors to the Riviera had dropped off to the point that the hotel was in severe financial difficulty. Seized by creditors, the Negresco was sold to a Belgian company. Henri Negresco died a few years later in Paris at the age of 52.

February 28, 1948, Suzy Delair sang C'est si bon in this hotel during the first Nice Jazz Festival. Louis Armstrong was present and loved the song. June 26, 1950, he recorded the American version of the song (English lyrics by Jerry Seelen) in New York City with Sy Oliver and his Orchestra. When it was released, the disc was a worldwide success and the song was then performed by the greatest international singers.

Over the years, the hotel had its ups and downs, and in 1957, it was sold to the Augier family. Madame  reinvigorated the hotel with luxurious decorations and furnishings, including an outstanding art collection and rooms with mink bedspreads. She also popularised it with celebrities; Elton John featured it in the video for his song "I'm Still Standing", and she told Bill Gates, the founder of Microsoft, that purchasing it would be beyond his means.

Noted for its doormen dressed in the manner of the staff in 18th-century elite bourgeois households, complete with red-plumed postilion hats, the hotel also offers gourmet dining at the Regency-style Le Chantecler restaurant. Le Chantecler has two stars in the Guide Michelin and 15/20 in Gault Millau. It has previously been under the leadership of famous chefs such as Bruno Turbot and Alain Llorca, who left to take over the equally fabled Moulin de Mougins. The restaurant interior is decorated with gobelins and roccoco furniture in untraditional colourings such as pink, lime, lemon, and cerulean.

In 2003, the Hotel Negresco was listed by the government of France as a National Historic Building and is a member of Leading Hotels of the World. The Negresco has a total of 119 guest rooms plus 22 suites.

In contemporary times
The fifth floor of the hotel is for "VVIP" guests, which stands for "very, very important persons". The hotel has a private beach, which is located across the street from the facility. 

In the wake of the 2016 Nice truck attack, the hotel's main hall was used to triage wounded civilians.

References

External links

Official website 

Hotels in France
Buildings and structures in Nice
Hotel buildings completed in 1912
Tourist attractions in Nice
1912 establishments in France
Édouard Niermans buildings